Cirque of the Unclimbables, located inside the Nahanni National Park Reserve, in the Northwest Territories, Canada, approximately  west of Yellowknife, is a cluster of peaks and walls in the Mackenzie Mountains Natural Region.

Description
According to the tourism promotion authority of the government of Northwest Territories:

History
In 1955, the mountaineer Arnold Wexler came across this series of remote cliffs in the Logan Mountains, now part of Nahanni National Park Reserve. Frustrated by their sheer granite walls, he named the jagged monsters the Cirque of the Unclimbables.

Access
Access to the Cirque and the Ragged Range is by charter aircraft.

Lotus Flower Tower and other climbs 
The Cirque's most famous peak is the Lotus Flower Tower featured in Fifty Classic Climbs of North America. Other climbs include Mount Proboscis, Club International, and Middle Huey Spire.

See also
National Parks of Canada
List of Northwest Territories parks

References

External links
 Northwest Territories Tourism
 Rock Climbing Guide to the Cirque of the Unclimbables

Two-thousanders of the Northwest Territories
Dehcho Region
Climbing areas of Canada
Cirques
Nahanni National Park Reserve